Randall is a city in Jewell County, Kansas, United States.  As of the 2020 census, the population of the city was 79.

History
Randall was originally called Vicksburg, and under the latter name laid out in 1870. It was renamed Randall in 1882. The community was named for Edward Randall, an original owner of the site.

Geography
Randall is located at  (39.642566, -98.044250).

Demographics

2010 census
As of the census of 2010, there were 65 people, 34 households, and 20 families living in the city. The racial makeup of the city was 96.9% White, 1.5% African American, and 1.5% from two or more races. Hispanic or Latino of any race were 3.1% of the population.

There were 34 households, of which 20.6% had children under the age of 18 living with them, 55.9% were married couples living together, 2.9% had a female householder with no husband present, and 41.2% were non-families. 41.2% of all households were made up of individuals, and 32.3% had someone living alone who was 65 years of age or older. The average household size was 1.91 and the average family size was 2.55.

The median age in the city was 57.8 years. 16.9% of residents were under the age of 18; 1.5% were between the ages of 18 and 24; 16.9% were from 25 to 44; 30.8% were from 45 to 64; and 33.8% were 65 years of age or older. The gender makeup of the city was 43.1% male and 56.9% female.

2000 census
As of the census of 2000, there were 90 people, 45 households, and 27 families living in the city. The racial makeup of the city was 100.00% White. Hispanic or Latino of any race were 1.11% of the population.

There were 45 households, out of which 22.2% had children under the age of 18 living with them, 53.3% were married couples living together, 6.7% had a female householder with no husband present, and 40.0% were non-families. 40.0% of all households were made up of individuals, and 26.7% had someone living alone who was 65 years of age or older. The average household size was 2.00 and the average family size was 2.67.

In the city, the population was spread out, with 21.1% under the age of 18, 3.3% from 18 to 24, 17.8% from 25 to 44, 20.0% from 45 to 64, and 37.8% who were 65 years of age or older. The median age was 51 years. For every 100 females, there were 83.7 males. For every 100 females age 18 and over, there were 82.1 males.

The median income for a household in the city was $26,250, and the median income for a family was $29,000. Males had a median income of $22,500 versus $26,250 for females. The per capita income for the city was $11,313. There were 3.3% of families and 4.1% of the population living below the poverty line, including 12.5% of under eighteens and none of those over 64.

Education
The community is served by Beloit USD 273 public school district, which operates Randall Elementary School, then go onwards to Beloit Junior-Senior High School.

Randall and Jewell schools were consolidated into Jewell-Randall schools in the 1960s. Prior to unification, the Randall High School mascot was Randall Panthers. In 2009 Beloit USD had absorbed some territory from USD 279 Jewell due to that district's dissolution.

References

Further reading

External links
 Randall - Directory of Public Officials
 Randall city map, KDOT

Cities in Kansas
Cities in Jewell County, Kansas